Erysimum kykkoticum is a species of flowering plant in the family Brassicaceae. It is endemic to the Mediterranean island of Cyprus. Its natural habitats are Mediterranean-type shrubby vegetation and rocky areas.  It is threatened by habitat loss.

References

kykkoticum
Critically endangered plants
Endemic flora of Cyprus
Taxonomy articles created by Polbot